The Oklahoma Court of Criminal Appeals is one of the two highest judicial bodies in the U.S. state of Oklahoma and is part of the Oklahoma Court System, the judicial branch of the Oklahoma state government.

As of 2011, the court meets in the Oklahoma Judicial Center, having previously met in the Oklahoma State Capitol.

History
The First Legislature of Oklahoma (1907–1908), through House Bill 397, established the Criminal Court of Appeals and granted it the exclusive appellate jurisdiction in criminal cases. House Bill 397 provided that should the constitutionality of a criminal case be in question, the Criminal Court of Appeals would turn the issue over to the Oklahoma Supreme Court. Judges of the court would be appointed by the Governor of Oklahoma, with the advice and consent of the Oklahoma Senate. The judges appointed were to hold office until January 1, 1911, when the court would be terminated unless continued by the state legislature. Henry Marshall Furman, Thomas H. Doyle, and H. G. Baker were appointed the first three judges of the court by Governor Charles Haskell.

The Second Legislature of Oklahoma (1909–1910) enacted House Bill 33 which perpetuated the Criminal Court of Appeals. The act repealed all prior laws in conflict and gave the court exclusive appellate jurisdiction. House Bill 33 provided that judges would be elected by the people of Oklahoma instead of appointed, with the first election of judges at the general election in 1910. The state was divided into three Criminal Court of Appeals judicial districts, designated respectively as the Eastern, Northern and Southern Criminal Court of Appeals judicial districts. The Twenty-seventh Legislature (1959–1960) enacted Senate Bill 36, which changed the name from Criminal Court of Appeals to Court of Criminal Appeals.

In a special election on July 11, 1967, constitutional amendments were adopted to provide a complete reorganization of the Oklahoma Court System. Beginning in 1968, judges of the Court of Criminal Appeals ran on a non-partisan statewide retention ballot at the General Election only. If retained by the voters, judges serve a six-year term. If rejected, the vacancy is filled by appointment of the Governor and Oklahoma Judicial Nominating Commission.

After the construction on the Oklahoma State Capitol, which was completed in 1917, the high court offices and chambers were housed in the building. Plans to move the offices began in 2006. In 2011, the Oklahoma Supreme Court moved its offices from the Oklahoma State Capitol to the Oklahoma Judicial Center.

Composition
Unlike the Oklahoma Supreme Court, the Oklahoma Constitution does not specify the size of the Court of Criminal Appeals. This grants the Oklahoma Legislature the power to fix the number of judges by statute.

Qualification, nomination, appointment and tenure of judges
Judges, at the time of their elections or appointments, must be at least thirty years old, must be registered voters in the Court of Criminal Appeals judicial districts they represent for at least one year before filing for the position, and must be licensed practicing attorneys or judges (or both) in Oklahoma for five years before their appointments. The potential judges must maintain their certifications as attorneys or judges during their tenures in office to main their positions.

Potential Judges who meet these requirements must submit their names to the Oklahoma Judicial Nominating Commission to verify that they will serve if appointed. In the event of a vacancy on the Court of Criminal Appeals, after reviewing potential Justices, the commission must submit three named to the governor, out of whom, the governor appoints one of the three to the Court of Criminal Appeals to serve until the next general state election. However, if the Governor fails to appoint a Justice within sixty days, the Chief Justice of Oklahoma may appoint one of the nominees, who must certify his or her appointment to Secretary of State of Oklahoma.

Judges of the Court of Criminal Appeals who are elected to retain their positions in the general state elections will continue to serve for another six years in office with their terms beginning on the second Monday in January following the general election. Justices appointed to fill vacancies take up office immediately and continue to serve in their appointed posts until the next general election. In order to be eligible to stand for reelection, Judges must, within sixty days before the general election, submit to the Secretary of State their desire to stand for reelection.

Judges who stand for reelection are then put to election by the people of Oklahoma. If the majority vote to retain the judges, they will serve for another six-year term. However, when a judge declines to seek reelection or is defeated, the seat on the Court of Criminal Appeals shall be considered vacant at the end of the current term and the Judicial Nominating Committee must search for a potential replacement. Judges who have failed to file for reelection or were not retained by the people of Oklahoma in the general election are not eligible to immediately succeed themselves.

Retention in office may be sought for successive terms without limit as to number of years or terms served in office. Since 1907, every judge that has sought reelection has won.

Jurisdiction and powers
The bifurcated system of separate final appeal courts for civil and criminal cases exists only in Oklahoma and neighboring Texas, meaning that, unlike most states, Oklahoma has two courts of last resort. The Oklahoma Supreme Court, which is considered the first among equals of the two, determines all issues of a civil nature, and the Oklahoma Court of Criminal Appeals decides all criminal matters. Regardless of where the appeal comes from, the Court of Criminal Appeals is always the first court to hear an appeal involving the death sentence in Oklahoma.

Whenever there is dispute involving whether a case falls under the jurisdiction of the Oklahoma Supreme Court or Court of Criminal Appeals, the Supreme Court determines which of the two bodies has jurisdiction.  Its decision on the matter is final.

Membership

Current judges
The Judges of the Oklahoma Court of Criminal Appeals are:

Timeline of judges

Since 1967
Beginning in 1968 with an amendment to the Oklahoma Constitution approved in 1967, seats on the Court of Criminal Appeals ceased being filled by partisan election and instead were filled by non-partisan appointment by the Governor of Oklahoma upon nomination by the Oklahoma Judicial Nominating Commission. Judges serve until the next general election following their appointment at which they are retained or rejected. If retained, they serve for an additional six-years until the next retention election.

Note: 
Bar key:

See also
Oklahoma Supreme Court

References

External links
 Oklahoma Court of Criminal Appeals website

Oklahoma
Court of Criminal Appeals
Court of Criminal Appeals
1907 establishments in Oklahoma
Courts and tribunals established in 1907